Phantom City Studio is an independent record label and audio recording studio in Orlando, Florida that started in 1999.

Notable artists
The recording studio is noted for its work with celebrities including Shaquille O'Neal, Miley Cyrus, Justin Bieber, Eminem, Snoop Dogg, José Altuve, Crystal McCahill, Cory Gunz, Lindsay Lohan, and major companies such as Disney, Universal Studios, Dr. Phillips, 20th Century Fox, The History Channel, Discovery Channel, Cartoon Network, E! Entertainment Television, American Idol, Scholastic Corporation, Toys "R" Us, HBO, Showtime, MTV, and VH1.

Phantom City
The studio is named after an excerpt from the 7th chapter of the Lotus Sutra, Phantom City.

See also
 List of US recording studios 
 List of record labels
 White label

References

External links

Houston Chronicle
Shaquille O'Neal at Phantom City Studio

American independent record labels
Record labels established in 1999
Companies based in Orlando, Florida
Recording studios in the United States
1999 establishments in Florida
American record labels